The following is a list of census-designated places within the US state of Pennsylvania, as of the 2010 United States Census

A

B

C

D

E

F

G

H

I

J

K

L

M

N
{|
|- valign=top
|
 Naomi - Fayette County
 Needmore - Fulton County
 Nemacolin - Greene County
 New Bedford - Lawrence County
 New Berlinville - Berks County
 New Castle Northwest - Lawrence County
 New Columbia - Union County
 New Freeport - Greene County
 New Jerusalem - Berks County
 New Kingstown - Cumberland County
|
 Newmanstown - Lebanon County
 New Market - York County
 New Salem - Fayette County
 New Schaefferstown - Berks County
 Newtown - Schuylkill County
 Newtown Grant - Bucks County
 New Tripoli - Lehigh County
 Nittany - Centre County
 Nixon - Butler County
 Noblestown - Allegheny County
|
 North Philipsburg - Centre County
 North Vandergrift - Armstrong County
 North Warren - Warren County
 Northwest Harborcreek - Erie County
 Northwood - Blair County
 Norvelt - Westmoreland County
 Noxen - Wyoming County
 Numidia - '"Columbia County Nuremberg - Schuylkill & Luzerne Counties|}

O

P

Q
 Queens Gate - York County Quentin - Lebanon CountyR

S

T

U

 Union Deposit - Dauphin County Unionville - Butler County University of Pittsburgh (Johnstown) - Cambria County Upper Exeter - Luzerne CountyV

W

Y
 Yeagertown - Mifflin County Yorklyn - York County Yukon - Westmoreland CountyZ
 Zion - Centre CountyFormer Census-designated places (Pre 2010 Census)

 Back Mountain - Luzerne County Beaverdale-Lloydell - Cambria County (renamed)
 Bendersville Station-Aspers - Adams County (renamed)
 Calumet-Norvelt - Westmoreland County Cashtown-McKnightstown - Adams County Devon-Berwyn - Chester County Duncott - Schuylkill County Fredericktown-Millsboro - Washington County Grier City-Park Crest - Schuylkill County Grindstone-Rowes Run - Fayette County Imperial-Enlow - Allegheny County Lavelle-Locustdale - Schuylkill County Leacock-Leola-Bareville - Lancaster County Lionville-Marchwood - Chester County McChesneytown-Loyalhanna - Westmoreland County Mechanicsville - Montour County New Boston-Morea - Schuylkill County New Salem-Buffington - Fayette County North Vandergrift-Pleasant View - Armstrong County Reinerton-Orwin-Muir - Schuylkill County Salix-Beauty Line Park - Cambria County (renamed)
 Salunga-Landisville - Lancaster County Springetts Manor-Yorklyn - York County Stonybrook-Wilshire - York County Sturgeon-Noblestown - Allegheny County Tyler Run-Queens Gate - York County Warren South - Warren County''

See also
 List of cities in Pennsylvania
 List of cities in Pennsylvania (by population)
 List of towns and boroughs in Pennsylvania
 List of townships in Pennsylvania
 List of enclaves in Pennsylvania

References

 
Pennsylvania